The 2002 election of the Speaker of the New Zealand House of Representatives occurred on 26 August 2002, following the 2002 general election result. The election resulted in the re-election of Labour Party MP Jonathan Hunt as Speaker. It was the first time an incumbent Speaker had been re-elected since 1982.

Nominated candidates
Two candidates were nominated:
 Rt Hon Jonathan Hunt, List MP – Labour Party
 Hon Ken Shirley, List MP – ACT Party

Election
The election was conducted by means of a conventional parliamentary motion. The Clerk of the House of Representatives conducted a vote on the question of the election of the Speaker, in accordance with Standing Order 19.

The following table gives the election results:

How each MP voted:

References

Speaker of the House of Representatives election
Speaker of the House of Representatives election
Speaker of the House of Representatives of New Zealand elections